Crane Tower is one of the nine remaining defensive towers within the city walls of Toruń, Poland.

Location 
The tower is located in the southern part of the Old Town Complex, at 3 Philadelphia Boulevard, to the west of the Bridge Gate (pol. Brama Mostowa).

History 
The tower was built around the end of the 13th century. Its name comes from its function. In 1823 it was extended and connected to the Swedish Granary at 1 Mostowa Street, located behind it.

Architecture 
The tower was built on a quadrilateral plan, using the Vendian brickwork. Following the 19th century reconstruction, it has four storeys and a usable attic; the original division into storeys was different, demonstrated by Gothic brick friezes laid diagonally. There are 19th century shooting ranges adapted to firearms on the ground floor. The upper floors have large openings closed in sections with wooden shutters. The attic floor houses a wooden crane, with a preserved mechanism. On the northern side, the tower is connected to the building at 1 Mostowa Street (the so-called Swedish Granary, now the Granary Hotel) with a suspended passageway of skeleton structure, with plastered fillings. The tower is currently covered with a gable roof.

Gallery

References

Sources 

 Baszta Żuraw – zabytek.pl (pol.)
 Baszta Żuraw – turystyka.torun.pl (pol.)

Buildings and structures in Toruń
Towers in Poland
13th-century establishments in Poland